The Cishan culture (6500–5000 BC) was a Neolithic culture in northern China, on the eastern foothills of the Taihang Mountains. The Cishan culture was based on the farming of broomcorn millet, the cultivation of which on one site has been dated back 10,000 years.
The people at Cishan also began to cultivate foxtail millet around 8700 years ago. However, these early dates have been questioned by some archaeologists due to sampling issues and lack of systematic surveying.

Common artifacts from the Cishan culture include stone grinders, stone sickles and tripod pottery.  The sickle blades feature fairly uniform serrations, which made the harvesting of grain easier.  Cord markings, used as decorations on the pottery, was more common compared to neighboring cultures.  Also, the Cishan potters created a broader variety of pottery forms such as basins, pot supports, serving stands, and drinking cups.

Since the culture shared many similarities with its southern neighbor, the Peiligang culture, both cultures were sometimes previously referred to together as the Cishan-Peiligang culture or Peiligang-Cishan culture. The Cishan culture also shared several similarities with its eastern neighbor, the Beixin culture. However, the contemporary consensus among archaeologists is that the Cishan people were members of a distinct culture that shared many characteristics with its neighbors.

This culture has been linked to the origin of the Sino-Tibetan language family.

Cishan type site
The type site at Cishan is located in Wu'an, Hebei, China on a low elevation mesa. The houses at Cishan were semi-subterranean and round. The site showed evidence of domesticated pigs, dogs and chickens, with pigs providing the primary source of meat. The Cishan people hunted deer and wild boar. Nuts (Juglans regia and Corylus heterophylla), Celtis bungeana, wild apricots and pears, and various roots and tubers were foraged from the surrounding forests. Fish was also an important part of the diet at Cishan, specifically carp and herring from the nearby river; fishing nets made from hemp fibers were used.

Over 500 subterranean storage pits were discovered at Cishan. These pits were used to store millet.

See also
 List of Neolithic cultures of China
 Dadiwan culture
 Prehistoric Beifudi site

Notes

References

 Allan, Sarah (ed), The Formation of Chinese Civilization: An Archaeological Perspective, 
 Higham, Charles, The Bronze Age of Southeast Asia, 
 
 
 

Neolithic cultures of China
History of Hebei
7th-millennium BC establishments
6th-millennium BC disestablishments